Wade Everett was the pseudonym used by the author Will Cook for some of his western novels. After Cook died in 1964, his Everett byline had become valuable enough that Ballantine Books turned it into a house name for novels written by other authors, including Giles A. Lutz.

Bibliography
First Command  (1959)
Fort Starke  (1959)
Last Scout (1960)
Big Man, Big Mountain (1961)
Killer (1962)
The Big Drive (1962)
Shotgun Marshal (1964)
Texas Ranger (1964)
Top Hand 1964)
Bullets for the Doctor (1965)
Cavalry Recruit (1965)
Texas Yankee (1966)
The Warrior  (1967)
Vengeance (1967)
The Whiskey Traders (1968)
Temporary Duty (1969)
Wind River Kid (1974)
Lone Hand from Texas (1992)
Bullet Range (1993)
The Fighting Texan (1993)

References

Western (genre) writers